A list of films produced in Iran ordered by year of release in the 1980s. For an alphabetical list of Iranian films see :Category:Iranian films

1980s

External links
 Iranian film at the Internet Movie Database

1980s
Iranian
Films